Robe is a wine region located in the south east of South Australia immediately adjoining the town of Robe.  The region received appellation as an Australian Geographical Indication (AGI) in 2006. It is part of the Limestone Coast wine zone.

Extent and appellation
The Robe wine region was registered as an Australian Geographical Indication on 15 August 2006 and is part of the Limestone Coast zone.

Grapes and wine
Alternatively, red wine varietals account for of plantings while white wines varietals account for of plantings. As of 2012, the region had three wineries and as of 2008, it had 13 growers.

See also

South Australian wine

Citations and references

Citations

References

External links
Robe Wine Region official tourism webpage

Wine regions of South Australia
Limestone Coast